Feel the Fire is the third studio album by American country music singer Reba McEntire. It was released on October 6, 1980, through  Mercury Records. Its first single release, "(You Lift Me) Up to Heaven", was her first top ten hit.

Track listing

Personnel

Vocals

 Thomas Brannon – backing vocals
 Phillip Forrest – backing vocals
 Yvonne Hodges – backing vocals
 Donna McElroy – backing vocals 
 Reba McEntire – lead and backing vocals
 Louis Dean Nunley – backing vocals

 Diane Tidwell – backing vocals
 Bergen White – backing vocals
 Trish Williams – backing vocals
 Dennis Wilson – backing vocals
 Gil Wright – backing vocals

Musicians

 Harold Bradley – guitar 
 Jerry Carrigan – drums
 Jimmy Capps – guitar
 Ray Edenton – guitar 
 Buddy Harman – drums
 Gordon Kennedy – guitar 
 Mike Leech – bass

 Charlie McCoy – guitar 
 Bob Moore – bass
 Weldon Myrick – steel guitar
 Hargus "Pig" Robbins – acoustic piano, keyboards
 Pete Wade – guitar
 Chip Young – guitar

Strings
 Marvin Chantry, Virginia Christensen and Gary Vanosdale – viola
 George Binkley III, Connie Ellisor, Carl Gorodetzky, Lennie Haight, Sheldon Kurland, Wilfred Lehmann Dennis Molchan, Samuel Terranova and Stephanie Woolf – violin 
 John Catchings and Roy Christensen – cello 
 Cindy Reynolds – harp
 Bergen White – string arrangements

Production
 Dennis Carney – photography 
 Lee Groitzsch – assistant engineer 
 Bob Heimall – art direction 
 Jerry Kennedy – producer
 Brent King – engineer
 Red Steagall – management 
 Woodland Studios (Nashville, Tennessee) – mastering location 
 Hank Williams – mastering
 Stephanie Zuras – design

Charts
Singles

References

1980 albums
Reba McEntire albums
Mercury Nashville albums
Albums produced by Jerry Kennedy